Daniel Rocamora Blázquez (born 27 May 1988) is a Spanish male volleyball player. He is part of the Spain men's national volleyball team. On club level he plays for TV Schönenwerd.

References

External links
 Daniel Rocamora Blazquez at the International Volleyball Federation
 
  Daniel Rocamora Blazquez at WorldofVolley

1988 births
Living people
Spanish men's volleyball players
Sportspeople from Barcelona
Mediterranean Games medalists in volleyball
Mediterranean Games silver medalists for Spain
Competitors at the 2009 Mediterranean Games